Sigurd Holter  (19 November 1886 – 1 August 1963)   was a Norwegian sailor and Olympic champion.

He was a crew member of the Norwegian boat Eleda (cox Erik Herseth), which won the gold medal in the 10 metre class (1907 rating) at the 1920 Summer Olympics in Antwerp.

References

External links

1886 births
1963 deaths
Norwegian male sailors (sport)
Sailors at the 1920 Summer Olympics – 10 Metre
Olympic sailors of Norway
Olympic gold medalists for Norway
Olympic medalists in sailing

Medalists at the 1920 Summer Olympics